This article is a list of lists of Muslims in various professions and fields.

Academics
 List of modern-day Muslim scholars of Islam
 List of Muslim historians
 List of Muslim philosophers
 List of Muslim scientists
 List of Muslim astronauts
 List of Muslim astronomers
 List of Muslim mathematicians
 List of Muslim theologians

Arts, entertainment, journalism
 List of Muslim painters
 List of Muslim writers and poets
 List of Muslims in entertainment and the media

Business

Law and politics
 List of Islamic jurists

Lists of Muslims by country or region
 Muslim rulers in the Indian subcontinent
 List of American Muslims
 List of African-American Muslims
 List of British Muslims
 List of Canadian Muslims
 List of Hyderabadi Muslims
 List of Israeli Arab Muslims
 List of Russian Muslims

Others
 List of Caliphs
 List of converts to Islam
 List of Da'is
 List of Islamic studies scholars
 List of Muslim comparative religionists
 List of Muslim dynasties
 List of Muslim feminists
 List of Muslim Nobel Laureates
 List of Muslim soldiers
 List of Sahabah
 List of non-Arab Sahabah
 List of Shi'a Muslims
 List of extinct Shi'a sects
 List of Shi'a Muslim dynasties
 List of Sufis
 List of Sufi saints
 List of Sufi singers
 List of Sunni Muslim dynasties

See also
 Prophets of Islam
 Lists of people by belief
 List of films about Muhammad
 List of inventions in the medieval Islamic world
 List of Muslim-majority countries
 List of Muslim educational institutions